Dryobalanops keithii is a species of plant in the family Dipterocarpaceae. The species is named after H.G. Keith, 1899–1982, a Conservator of Forests in North Borneo (now Sabah). This species is endemic to Borneo, where it is threatened due to habitat loss. It is a main canopy to low emergent tree, up to 40 m tall, found in mixed dipterocarp forest on well-drained but moist clay soils. It is a heavy hardwood sold under the trade names of  Kapur.

References

keithii
Endemic flora of Borneo
Trees of Borneo
Flora of Sabah
Critically endangered flora of Asia
Flora of the Borneo lowland rain forests